The Fall of an Eagle is a 1965 novel written by Australian author Jon Cleary set in Anatolia. The hero is an American engineer building a dam.

At one stage producer Audrey Baring was going to make a movie out of the book but although Cleary did a script none was made.

References

External links
The Fall of an Eagle at AustLit (subscription required)

1965 Australian novels
Novels set in Turkey
William Collins, Sons books
William Morrow and Company books
Novels by Jon Cleary